Catherine Shirriff is a Canadian actress.

Shirriff was born in Toronto, Ontario, Canada. Her notable roles include the horror comedy Vampira (1974), Bob Fosse's film All That Jazz (1979), as the Klingon Valkris in Star Trek III: The Search for Spock (1984), Olga Denerenko in Murder in Space (1985), and co-host with Jack Palance of the first season of the ABC television documentary series Ripley's Believe It or Not!.

Personal life
Shirriff is married to American financier J. Anthony Forstmann and they have one daughter.

Filmography

References

External links
 

Living people
Canadian television actresses
Canadian film actresses
Actresses from Toronto
1948 births